Lubomierz  is a town in Lwówek Śląski County, Lower Silesian Voivodeship, in south-western Poland. It is the seat of the administrative district (gmina) called Gmina Lubomierz.

As of 2019, the town has a population of 1,979.

Notable people
Hieronymus Vietor (ca. 1480 – 1546/1547), printer and publisher

Twin towns – sister cities
See twin towns of Gmina Lubomierz.

References

Cities and towns in Lower Silesian Voivodeship
Lwówek Śląski County
Cities in Silesia